China Top Brand was a Chinese mark for well recognized brands. It was created in 2001 to promote strong Chinese brand names. In 2010 the General Administration of Quality Supervision, Inspection and Quarantine (AQSIQ) announced that the mark was being phased out.

References 

Chinese brands